Morrison Rockwood State Park is an Illinois state park on  located north of Morrison in Whiteside County, Illinois, United States. The park was established in 1971 and opened for day use that same year. It is named after the nearby Rock Creek and the heavily wooded park area "Rockwood". Lake Carlton is located within the park. The lake was named in memory of L. Carlton Anderson, a local citizen who promoted the park and was an important civic and conservation leader.

References

Protected areas established in 1971
Protected areas of Whiteside County, Illinois
State parks of Illinois
1971 establishments in Illinois